Guido Edmond Tepshi (born 8 April 1991) is an Albanian footballer who played in the Albanian Superliga.

References

External links
 Profile - FSHF

1991 births
Living people
Footballers from Durrës
Albanian footballers
Albania youth international footballers
Association football midfielders
KF Teuta Durrës players
KS Lushnja players
FK Bohemians Prague (Střížkov) players
KS Kastrioti players
FC Kamza players
KF Apolonia Fier players
KF Këlcyra players
Kategoria Superiore players
Kategoria e Dytë players
Albanian expatriate footballers
Expatriate footballers in the Czech Republic
Albanian expatriate sportspeople in the Czech Republic